Yulia Sergeyevna Mikhalchik (born February 2, 1985, Slantsy, Leningrad Oblast, RSFSR, USSR) is a Russian pop and folk singer,  composer and songwriter.

Early life
Yulia Sergeyevna Mikhalchik was born on February 2, 1985. Her parents noted her musical abilities at a young age and enrolled her a in music school where she studied piano. At the age of 6, she debuted on stage at the music school, performing the song "Kiss-Kiss-Meow." In 1994, she and her mother moved to Saint Petersburg where Mikhalchik gave her first serious performance at the Samanta music festival. Following this, she was accepted into the choir of the Saint Petersburg-based channel 5TV, where she competed in competitions and festivals for a number of years.

Mikhalchik graduated from secondary school in 2002 with a silver medal. She subsequently studied public relations at the Saint Petersburg Humanitarian University of Trade Unions. Later, Mikhalchik graduated from the Russian State University for the Humanities with a degree in PR.

Career 

As a child, Mikhalchik participated in various international music competitions, including, in 1999, Clear Voice; in 2000, the competition  Amber Star  in  Jurmala; in 2001, the competition Young Petersburg, the contest Voice of Peace  and the St. Petersburg competition Idols of the XXI century (Grand Prix).  She was scouted by producer Sergey Kokay in 2002 to become part of the group Korona, with which she performed in night clubs in St. Petersburg.

During the first year of her studies at the university, she presented the programme Youth Channel on TNT. However, she rose to prominence a year later when she applied to the Russian reality music competition Fabrika Zvyozd upon Alexander Shulgin's invitation. Here, she made it to the final sixteen participants. She stayed on the show until the final, where she eventually placed third. As a result of her participation in the television programme, Mikhalchik was forced to drop out of her university degree. 

Following Fabrika Zvyozd, Mikhailchik released her first single "So l'dom" in 2004 and her first album Yesli pridyot zima in 2006, which was produced by Viktor Drobysh. That latter year, she received her first and only Golden Gramophone Award for the song "Do svidaniya, Piter".
In 2005, she sang two duets with Al Bano in the State Kremlin Palace during his concert show Al Bano and His Ladies. 

In 2006, she also participated in the second All-Russian music festival  , held in Sochi in September 2006, where she on the Grand Prix. Subsequently, she released her second album Kosy. 

In 2008, she participated in the Russian preselection for the Eurovision Song Contest 2008. With her song "Cold Fingers", she finished sixth in the final. In 2009, she starred as Charlotte in the rock opera Perfume, on the play by Patrick Süskind.

During the 2010s, Mikhalchik changed her style from pop-folk to Russian chanson. In 2011, she released a third album, containing old Russian chansons. In 2019, Mikhalchik performed "Snova i snova", an electropop song, during New Wave. In that same year, she took part in the television programme The Fate of a Person on Russia-1, chronicling her life.

Personal life 
Mikhalchik was engaged to musician Alexander Shulgin in 2003, but up broke with him a year later. The relationship with Shulgin was controversial in Russia for the 21 year age gap between the two. Next to that, it was controversial because Shulgin was the creative producer of the season of Fabrika Zvyozd in which Mikhalchik took part. Shulgin proposed to Mikhalchik during the final of the show, but the proposal was cut out in later broadcasts of the final. 

In 2011, Mikhalchik married a businessman named Vladimir. In 2013, their son was born. In March 2016, the couple divorced.

When Mikhalchik was around 23 years old, she started struggling with anorexia nervosa and was hospitalised for one month in her most critical phase. Next to that, she had problems with depression. In 2018, she starred in an episode of Live healthily on Channel One Russia, in which she told about her experiences with anorexia.

Awards 
1999 —  Winner of the international competition  Sonorous voices  in the city of Vyborg
2000 —  Winner of the international competition  Amber Star  in Jurmala 
2001 —  Winner of the contest  Young Petersburg  in St. Petersburg
2001 —  Winner of the  Wider Circle  international festival in Narva
2001 —  Grand Prix of competition  Idols of the XXI Century  in St. Petersburg
2003 —  Third place in the  Channel One Russia on Fabrika Zvyozd
2005 —  Prize Golden Gramophone for the song  Goodbye, Piter 
2006 —  Grand Prix of the festival 5 Star  of young artists
2012 —  Prize  Star of Road Radio

References

External links
 Official website
 Юлия Михальчик / биография
 Юлия Михальчик - Лебедь белая

1985 births
Living people
People from Slantsy
Russian folk singers
Russian folk-pop singers
Russian State University for the Humanities alumni
Russian women composers
Russian folk musicians
Fabrika Zvyozd
Russian women singer-songwriters
21st-century Russian singers
21st-century Russian women singers
Winners of the Golden Gramophone Award